The Proto-Dené–Caucasian language is the hypothetical common ancestor of the Basque, Burushaski, North Caucasian, Sino-Tibetan, Yeniseian, Na-Dené and possibly also other languages of Eurasia and North America.

The relationship among these languages and the existence of a Dene–Caucasian family is disputed by most linguists.

Several remarks must be made:
The inclusion of Na-Dené (here understood to include Haida) is only preliminary, as the work on the regular sound correspondences has not been completed yet.
Sumerian has been included only as a tentative member. As with other ancient languages, much work remains to be done to elucidate its phonology. Besides Dené–Caucasian, Sumerian has also been compared to Nostratic (and/or its branches) and Austric (especially Munda). None of these proposals are considered as conclusive. There is not enough evidence to state with certainty that Sumerian was (or, in the case of the oldest proto-languages, was not) a relative of any of them.

Glossary

Special lists

100-word list

Body Parts

Pronominal morphemes

Class affixes

Other words 

The majority of the word forms in the table represent reconstructions in the respective proto-languages, to wit, Proto-Basque, Proto-North Caucasian, Proto-Burushaski, Proto-Sino-Tibetan, Proto-Yeniseian and Proto-Na-Dené (here meant to include Haida). Nevertheless, especially in the cases of Na-Dené, North Caucasian and Sino-Tibetan, some expressions have not been attested in the whole family and can only be traced back to the individual intermediate daughter (proto-)languages. See the footnotes for details. As for Proto-Na-Dené, its reconstruction is still in its infancy but may soon be improved thanks to the recently finished dictionary of Haida.

As above, /V/ means that the vowel in this position has not been successfully reconstructed yet,

1 (c) bizkar /biskarː/ ‘back; crest, hill’; */bi/- is a fossilized inanimate marker, *-/rː/ is a fossilized plural ending.
2 Proto-Abkhaz-Tapant ‘back’ > Abkhaz азқәа /azkʷa/, etc.
3 ‘on one’s back’ – must be preceded by personal prefix, e.g. /ˈa-sqa/ ‘on my back’.
4 */suga/ / */ʔuska/ ‘back, backwards’ (adverb), e.g. Ket /ɕuga⁶/; /uɕka⁵/ ‘back (homeward)’, etc. (the raised numbers are tones – which ones?)
5 Haida (Skidegate) sku /sku/, (Masset) sgwaay /sgwaːj/ ‘back’.
6 */nHɨwɢːAː/ / */ɢːHwɨnAː/ >  Lezgi /qːyn/ ‘shoulder’, Bezhta нухъулӀ /nuq-ut͡ɬ/ ‘armpit’, Dargwa: Akusha наикъ /naɪqː/ ‘hand, arm’, etc.
7 Old Chinese ‘shoulder’.
8 Ket /kɛn-tə-buʎ⁵/ ‘shoulder joint’, Arin /qínaŋ/ ‘arm’, etc.
9 Proto-Athabaskan–Eyak. Navajo -gaan –/gàːn/ ‘arm; foreleg (of animal); limb (of tree)’, Chipewyan gghan /gʁàn/- ‘arm’, etc.
10 (B) soin /ɕoin/ ‘shoulder, garment’, (Z) suin /ɕuin/ ‘shoulder, midsection of pork’, süñhegi /ɕyɲ-hegi/ ‘shoulder’, etc.
11 Proto-East-Caucasian. Lezgi /t͡s̕um/ ‘shin-bone’, Archi /t͡s̕am-mul/ ‘ankle’, Chechen носта /nosta/ ‘shin, shank’, etc.
12 (Y,H,N) ‘limbs, body parts’.
13 Proto-Athabaskan–Eyak. Navajo ts'in /t͡s̕ìn/ ‘bone’, Hupa /t͡s̕iŋʔ/  / /t͡s̕in-eʔ/ ‘bone, leg’, Galice /t͡s̕an/ ‘bone’, etc.; Eyak -/t͡s̕al/ ‘bone’.
14 (Baztan) emakuntza /emakunt͡sa/ ‘vulva, parte exterior de la vagina en el ganado’; probably modified < */kult͡sa/ by influence of the noun-forming suffix *-/kunt͡sa/ (-kuntza).
15 Proto-East-Caucasian. Akhwakh /k̕at͡ʃ̕o/ ‘vulva’, Archi /k̕at͡ʃ̕a/ ‘penis (of a boy)’, etc.
16 ‘vulva’
17 Kott /kant͡ʃal/ ‘testiculi’, Pumpokol /kutːe/ ‘penis’.
18 Eyak ‘penis’.
19 ‘mouse’; cf. also (c) saguzar /ɕagu-sar/ ‘bat’ (‘old mouse’), satitsu /ɕat-it͡ɕu/ ‘mole’ (‘blind mouse’), etc.
20 Chechen шатӀкъа /ʃat̕q̕a/ ‘weasel’, Avar цӀакьу /t͡sat͡ɬ̕ːˈu/ id., Tsakhur сок /sok/ id., Adyghe цыгъуа /t͡səʁʷa/ ‘mouse’, etc.
21 (Y) /t͡ɕarˈge/ ‘flying squirrel’.
22 Old Chinese */sreŋ/ ‘weasel’, Tibetan /sre-moŋ/ ‘weasel’, Burmese /hraɲ̊ʔ/ ‘squirrel’, etc.
23 Ket /saʔq/, Yug /saʔx/ / /saʔq/, Kott /ʃaga/, etc. ‘squirrel’.
24 Proto-Athabaskan–Eyak–Tlingit. Tlingit tsalg /t͡saɬg/ ‘squirrel’; cf. Eyak /t͡səɬk̕/ id., Proto-Athabaskan */t͡sələx/ > Mattole /t͡salis/, etc.
25 Abstracted from (B) araka /ara-ka/ ‘knot (of tree)’, (R) arakaldi /ara-kaldi/ ‘tanda de palos’.
26 Proto-East-Caucasian. Akhwakh, Tindi, etc. /hala/, Tsez ара /ara/, Hinukh али /ali/ ‘branch’.
27 Tibetan /jal-ga/ ‘branch, bough’, Lushai /zaːr/ ‘bough, branch’.
28 Ket /ulan⁵/, Yugh /ulan⁵/ ‘rod, twig’.
29 Proto-Athabaskan–Eyak. Hupa /ʔiɬ/ ‘pine boughs’, Navajo ił /ʔìɬ/ ‘evergreen boughs’, etc.; Eyak /ʔaːɬ/ ‘bough, branch (of conifer)’.
30 (B) ke, kei-, (AN) ke, eke, (L,Z) khe /kʰe/, (R) eke ‘smoke’. Regular loss of nasal < PDC cluster *-/ŋH/-.
31 Avar кӀуй /k̕ːuj/, Bezhta, Hunzib хъо /qo/, Udi /kːuin/, Ubykh /ʁʷa/, etc. ‘smoke’.
32 Old Chinese */kʰiws/ ‘smell, fragrance, stench’, Tibetan /dku/ ‘sweet scent; unpleasant scent’, Burmese /kʰəwh/ ‘smoke’, etc.
33 Kott /kiŋ/ ‘smell’. Cf. Basque */kino/ > (BN,L) k(h)ino ‘bad odor’, (Z) khiño /kʰiɲo/ ‘bad taste’.
34 Proto-Athabaskan–Eyak. Hupa /xoŋʔ/, Galice /kʷanʔ/, Navajo kǫ' /kõ̀ʔ/, Chipewyan kún /kún/ ‘fire’, etc.; Eyak -/quʔ/- ‘fire’ (prefix).
35 Modern Basque izar ‘star’, izarra ‘the star’.
36 Akhwakh /t͡s̕ʷːari/, Batsbi /t̕ʕejri/, Dargwa: Chiragh зуре /zure/, Abkhaz аиеҿа /ˈa-jat͡ʃ̕a/, etc. ‘star’.
37 Tibetan /ãt͡sʰer/ ‘to shine, to glitter’; /zer/, /g-zer/ ‘ray’, Kachin /d͡ʒan¹/ ‘the sun’, etc. Is that a high tone?
38 (Y) /aˈsumun/, (H,N) /aˈsii/ (pl. /aˈsiimut͡s/).
39 Old Chinese */seːŋ/ ‘star’ (Modern Mandarin xīng /siŋ˥/ ‘star’), Lepcha /kur-sóŋ/ ‘bright, lucid, name of 5th month, a planet, the morning star’, Kiranti */saŋ/ ‘star’, etc.
40 Proto-Athabaskan. Hupa /t͡siŋʔ/, Mattole /t͡siŋ/, Navajo sǫ' /sõ̀ʔ/, Dena'ina sen /sən/, sem /səm/, sim /sim/, Carrier sum /sʌm/ ‘star’, etc.
41 (c) egun, (Z) egün ‘day’.
42 Proto-East-Caucasian. Hinukh /ʁʷede/, Bezhta водо /wodo/ ‘day’, Lak гъантта /hantːa/ ‘a day, 24 hours’, etc.
43 (Y,H,N) /gunt͡s/ ‘day’; cf. (Y,H,N) /gon/ ‘dawn’.
44 Ket /qɔŋ⁴/ ‘by daytime’, Kott /hoːnaŋ/ ‘not long ago’, etc.
45 Proto-Athabaskan–Eyak. */gʷeːn/ >  */d͡ʒʷeːn/ > Hupa /d͡ʒeːn-is/, /d͡ʒiŋ/- ‘day’, Sarsi /d͡zín-is/, Navajo jį /d͡ʒĩ̀/, etc.; Eyak /gah/ ‘day’.
46 ‘plot, place, space, situation’: (B,G) une, (AN) une, gune, (BN,L) gune, (Z) güne, üne.
47 Tsez хъун /qun/ ‘farmstead’, Hinukh /qʷen/ id., Abaza гӀвна /ʕʷna/ ‘house’, Adyghe уэна /wəna/ id., etc.
48 Old Chinese */kuŋ/ ‘palace’, Tibetan /kʰjim/ ‘house’, Lepcha /kʰjum/ ‘house’, etc.
49 Proto-Athabaskan. Navajo kin /kìn/, Chipewyan kųę́ /kũ-ẽ́/ / kįę́ /kĩ-ẽ́/ ‘house’.
50 (c) aska /aɕka/, (Z) arska /arɕka/ ‘trough, manger’.
51 */t͡ɕːæq̕wa/ ~ */t͡ɕ̕ːæqwa/ > Archi /t͡ʃ̕aq̕ʷ/ ‘spoon; wooden shovel for winnowing’, Avar (dial.) чӀикӀаро /t͡ʃ̕ːiˈk̕aro/ ‘spoon’, Ubykh /t͡ʃaˈq̕ʷə/ ‘basin, tureen’, etc.
52 (H) -/t͡ɕuq/, (N) -/ˈt͡ɕoq/ ‘a measure of grain’, (Y) /t͡ɕiq/ ‘a measure of grain; a tray for sifting wheat’.
53 Old Chinese */t͡ɕekʷs/ ‘to empty a cup’, */t͡ɕekʷ/ ‘wine cup’, Lushai /suak/~/suaʔ/ ‘to ladle, ladle out’.
54 Ket /ɕɨʔk/, Yugh /sɨʔk/ ‘trough for dough (почёвка)’.
55 Hupa /t͡s̕aʔ/- ‘basket’, Minto /t͡θ̕og/ ‘plate’, Navajo ts'aa' /t͡s̕àːʔ/  ‘shallow basket’, etc.; Eyak /t͡s̕aːk-ɬ/ ‘dipper’; Tlingit s'éex' /s̕íx̕/ ‘dish, plate’.

Notes

See also
Dene–Caucasian languages

References
BENGTSON, John D., 2006. "Materials for a Comparative Grammar of the Dene–Caucasian (Sino-Caucasian) Languages."
BENGTSON, John D., 2004. "Some features of Dene–Caucasian phonology (with special reference to Basque)." In Cahiers de l'Institut de linguistique de Louvain (CILL): 33–54.
BENGTSON, John D., 2003. "Notes on Basque Comparative Phonology." Mother Tongue 8: 21–39.
BENGTSON, John D., 2002. "The Dene–Caucasian noun prefix *s-." In The Linguist's Linguist: A Collection of Papers in Honour of Alexis Manaster Ramer, ed. by F. Cavoto, pp. 53–57. Munich: LINCOM Europa.
BENGTSON, John D., 1999. "Wider genetic affiliations of the Chinese language." Journal of Chinese Linguistics 27 (1): 1–12.
BENGTSON, John D., 1999. "Review of R.L. Trask, The History of Basque." In Romance Philology 52 (Spring): 219–224.
BENGTSON, John D., 1998. "Caucasian and Sino-Tibetan: A Hypothesis of S. A. Starostin." General Linguistics, Vol. 36, no. 1/2, 1998 (1996). Pegasus Press, University of North Carolina, Asheville, North Carolina.
BENGTSON, John D., 1997. "Ein Vergleich von Burushaski und Nordkaukasisch". Georgica volume, pages?
BENGTSON, John D., 1997. "The riddle of Sumerian: A Dene–Caucasic language?" Mother Tongue 3: 63–74.
BENGTSON, John D., 1996. "A Final (?) Response to the Basque Debate in Mother Tongue 1." (see External links below)
RUHLEN, Merritt, 2001. "Il Dene–caucasico: una nuova famiglia linguistica." Pluriverso 2: 76–85.
RUHLEN, Merritt, 1998. "Dene–Caucasian: A New Linguistic Family," in The Origins and Past of Modern Humans—Towards Reconciliation, ed. by Keiichi Omoto and Phillip V. Tobias, Singapore: World Scientific, 231–46.
RUHLEN, Merritt, 1998. "The Origin of the Na-Dene." Proceedings of the National Academy of Sciences of the U.S.A. 95: 13994–13996.
SHEVOROSHKIN, Vitaliy V., 2004. "Proto-Salishan and Proto-North-Caucasian Consonants: a few cognate sets." in Nostratic Centennial Conference: the Pécs Papers. ed. by. I. Hegedűs & P. Sidwell, pp. 181–191. Pécs: Lingua Franca Group.
SHEVOROSHKIN, Vitaliy V., 2003. "Salishan and North Caucasian." Mother Tongue 8: 39–64.
SHEVOROSHKIN, Vitaliy V., 1999 "Nostratic and Sino-Caucasian: two ancient language phyla." In From Neanderthal to Easter Island (Festschrift W. W. Schuhmacher), ed. by N. A. Kirk & P. J. Sidwell. pp. 44–74. Melbourne.
SHEVOROSHKIN, Vitaliy V., 1998. 1998 Symposium on Nostratic at Cambridge. Mother Tongue 31, 28–32 (the whole issue as image files)
STAROSTIN, Sergei A., 2004–2005. Sino-Caucasian comparative phonology & Sino-Caucasian comparative glossary.
STAROSTIN, Sergei A., 2002. "A response to Alexander Vovin's criticism of the Sino-Caucasian theory." Journal of Chinese Linguistics 30.1:142–153.
STAROSTIN, Sergei A., 2000. "Genesis of the Long Vowels in Sino-Tibetan." In Проблемы изучения дальнего родства языков на рыбеже третьего тысячелетия: Доклады и тезисы международной конференции РГГУ, Moscow 2000.
STAROSTIN, Sergei A., 1996. "Word-final resonants in Sino-Caucasian." Journal of Chinese Linguistics 24.2: 281–311. (written for the 3rd International Conference on Chinese Linguistics in Hong Kong in 1994)
STAROSTIN, Sergei A., 1995. "Old Chinese Basic Vocabulary: A Historical Perspective." In The Ancestry of the Chinese Language (Journal of Chinese Linguistics Monograph No. 8), ed. by W. S.-Y. Wang, pp. 225–251. Berkeley, CA.
STAROSTIN, Sergei A., 1994. "A Comparative Dictionary of North Caucasian Languages". Moscow.  (see External links below)
STAROSTIN, Sergei A. and Orel, V., 1989. "Etruscan and North Caucasian." Explorations in Language Macrofamilies. Ed. V. Shevoroshkin. Bochum Publications in Evolutionary Cultural Semiotics. 23. Bochum.
VOVIN, Alexander, 1997. "The Comparative Method and Ventures Beyond Sino-Tibetan." Journal of Chinese Linguistics 25.2: 308–336.
VOVIN, Alexander, 1997. "Building a 'bum-pa for Sino-Caucasian." Journal of Chinese Linguistics 30.1: 154–171.

External links
 starling.rinet.ru
 www.sfs.nphil.uni-tuebingen.de
 Sino-caucasian etymology starling.rinet.ru
 ahlstudies at www.tlg.uci.edu
 dhumbissues at www.tlg.uci.edu

Dené–Caucasian languages